On 26 December 2004, at 07:58:53 local time (UTC+7), a major earthquake with a magnitude of 9.1–9.3  struck with an epicentre off the west coast of northern Sumatra, Indonesia. The undersea megathrust earthquake, known by the scientific community as the Sumatra–Andaman earthquake, was caused by a rupture along the fault between the Burma Plate and the Indian Plate, and reached a Mercalli intensity up to IX in some areas.

The direct results caused major disruptions to living conditions and commerce in coastal provinces of surrounded countries, including Aceh (Indonesia), Sri Lanka, Tamil Nadu (India) and Khao Lak (Thailand). Banda Aceh reported the largest number of deaths.

The earthquake was the third-largest ever recorded based upon seismographic measurements, the largest in the 21st century and had the longest duration of faulting ever observed, between eight and ten minutes. Its epicentre was between Simeulue and mainland Sumatra. The plight of the affected people and countries prompted a worldwide humanitarian response, with donations totalling more than US$14 billion.

Earthquake

The 2004 Indian Ocean earthquake was initially documented as having a moment magnitude of 8.8. In February 2005, scientists revised the estimate of the magnitude to 9.0. Although the Pacific Tsunami Warning Center has accepted these new numbers, the United States Geological Survey has, as of 2022, so far not changed its estimate of 9.1. A 2006 study estimated a magnitude of  9.1–9.3; Hiroo Kanamori of the California Institute of Technology estimates that 9.2 is representative of the earthquake's size.

The earthquake (followed by the tsunami) was felt in Bangladesh, India, Malaysia, Myanmar, Thailand, Sri Lanka and the Maldives. Splay faults, or secondary "pop up faults", caused long, narrow parts of the seafloor to pop up in seconds. This quickly elevated the height and increased the speed of waves, destroying the nearby Indonesian town of Lhoknga.

Indonesia lies between the Pacific Ring of Fire along the north-eastern islands adjacent to New Guinea, and the Alpide belt that runs along the south and west from Sumatra, Java, Bali, Flores to Timor. The 2002 Sumatra earthquake is believed to have been a foreshock, preceding the main event by over two years.

Historical comparisons 

Great earthquakes, such as the 2004 Indian Ocean earthquake, are associated with megathrust events in subduction zones. Their seismic moments can account for a significant fraction of the global seismic moment across century-scale periods. Of all the moment released by earthquakes in the 100 years from 1906 through 2005, roughly one eighth was due to the 2004 Indian Ocean earthquake. This quake, together with the Great Alaskan earthquake (1964) and the Great Chilean earthquake (1960), account for almost half of the total moment.

Since 1900, the only earthquakes recorded with a greater magnitude were the 1960 Valdivia earthquake (magnitude 9.5) and the 1964 Alaska earthquake in Prince William Sound (magnitude 9.2). The only other recorded earthquakes of magnitude 9.0 or greater were off Kamchatka, Russia, on 4 November 1952 (magnitude 9.0) and Tōhoku, Japan (magnitude 9.1) in March 2011. Each of these megathrust earthquakes also spawned tsunamis in the Pacific Ocean. In comparison to the 2004 Indian Ocean earthquake, the death toll from these earthquakes and tsunamis was significantly lower, primarily because of the lower population density along the coasts near affected areas.

Comparisons with earlier earthquakes are difficult, as earthquake strength only began to be measured systematically in the 1930s. However, historical earthquake strength can sometimes be estimated by examining historical descriptions of the damage caused, and the geological records of the areas where they occurred. Some examples of significant historical megathrust earthquakes are the 1868 Arica earthquake in Peru and the 1700 Cascadia earthquake in western North America.

Tectonic plates

The 2004 Indian Ocean earthquake was unusually large in geographical and geological extent. An estimated  of fault surface slipped (or ruptured) about  along the subduction zone where the Indian Plate slides under (or subducts) the overriding Burma Plate. The slip did not happen instantaneously but took place in two phases over several minutes:
After a pause of about another 100 seconds, the rupture continued northwards towards the Andaman and Nicobar Islands.

The India Plate meets the Burma Plate (which is considered a portion of the great Eurasian Plate) at the Sunda Trench. At this point, the India Plate subducts beneath the Burma Plate, which carries the Nicobar Islands, the Andaman Islands, and northern Sumatra. The India Plate sinks deeper and deeper beneath the Burma Plate until the increasing temperature and pressure drive volatiles out of the subducting plate. These volatiles rise into the overlying plate, causing partial melting and the formation of magma. The rising magma intrudes into the crust above and exits the Earth's crust through volcanoes in the form of a volcanic arc. The volcanic activity that results as the Indo-Australian Plate subducts the Eurasian Plate has created the Sunda Arc.

As well as the sideways movement between the plates, the 2004 Indian Ocean earthquake resulted in a rise of the seafloor by several metres, displacing an estimated  of water and triggering devastating tsunami waves. The waves radiated outwards along the entire  length of the rupture (acting as a line source). This greatly increased the geographical area over which the waves were observed, reaching as far as Mexico, Chile, and the Arctic. The raising of the seafloor significantly reduced the capacity of the Indian Ocean, producing a permanent rise in the global sea level by an estimated .

Aftershocks and other earthquakes

Numerous aftershocks were reported off the Andaman Islands, the Nicobar Islands and the region of the original epicentre in the hours and days that followed. The magnitude 8.7 2005 Nias–Simeulue earthquake, which originated off the coast of the Sumatran island of Nias, is not considered an aftershock, despite its proximity to the epicentre, and was most likely triggered by stress changes associated with the 2004 event. The earthquake produced its own aftershocks (some registering a magnitude of as high as 6.1) and presently ranks as the third-largest earthquake ever recorded on the moment magnitude or Richter magnitude scale.

Other aftershocks of up to magnitude 6.6 continued to shake the region daily for three or four months. As well as continuing aftershocks, the energy released by the original earthquake continued to make its presence felt well after the event. A week after the earthquake, its reverberations could still be measured, providing valuable scientific data about the Earth's interior.

The 2004 Indian Ocean earthquake came just three days after a magnitude 8.1 earthquake in the sub-antarctic Auckland Islands, an uninhabited region west of New Zealand, and Macquarie Island to Australia's north. This is unusual since earthquakes of magnitude eight or more occur only about once per year on average. The U.S. Geological Survey sees no evidence of a causal relationship between these events.

The 2004 Indian Ocean earthquake is thought to have triggered activity in both Leuser Mountain and Mount Talang, volcanoes in Aceh along the same range of peaks, while the 2005 Nias–Simeulue earthquake had sparked activity in Lake Toba, an ancient crater in Sumatra.

Energy released

This energy is equivalent to over 1,500 times that of the Hiroshima atomic bomb, but less than that of Tsar Bomba, the largest nuclear weapon ever detonated.

By February 2005, the earthquake's effects were still detectable as a  complex harmonic oscillation of the Earth's surface, which gradually diminished and merged with the incessant free oscillation of the Earth more than four months after the earthquake.

Because of its enormous energy release and shallow rupture depth, the earthquake generated remarkable seismic ground motions around the globe, particularly due to huge Rayleigh (surface) elastic waves that exceeded  in vertical amplitude everywhere on Earth. The record section plot displays vertical displacements of the Earth's surface recorded by seismometers from the IRIS/USGS Global Seismographic Network plotted with respect to time (since the earthquake initiation) on the horizontal axis, and vertical displacements of the Earth on the vertical axis (note the 1 cm scale bar at the bottom for scale). The seismograms are arranged vertically by distance from the epicentre in degrees. The earliest, lower amplitude signal is that of the compressional (P) wave, which takes about 22 minutes to reach the other side of the planet (the antipode; in this case near Ecuador). The largest amplitude signals are seismic surface waves that reach the antipode after about 100 minutes. The surface waves can be clearly seen to reinforce near the antipode (with the closest seismic stations in Ecuador), and to subsequently encircle the planet to return to the epicentral region after about 200 minutes. A major aftershock (magnitude 7.1) can be seen at the closest stations starting just after the 200-minute mark. The aftershock would be considered a major earthquake under ordinary circumstances but is dwarfed by the mainshock.

The shift of mass and the massive release of energy slightly altered the Earth's rotation. Weeks after the earthquake, theoretical models suggested the earthquake shortened the length of a day by 2.68 microseconds, due to a decrease in the oblateness of the Earth. Because of tidal effects of the Moon, the length of a day increases at an average of 15 microseconds per year, so any rotational change due to the earthquake will be lost quickly.

There was  movement laterally and  vertically along the fault line. Since movement was vertical as well as lateral, some coastal areas may have been moved to below sea level.

The survey, conducted using a high-resolution, multi-beam sonar system, revealed that the earthquake had made a considerable impact on the topography of the seabed.  thrust ridges created by previous geologic activity along the fault had collapsed, generating landslides several kilometres wide. An oceanic trench several kilometres wide was exposed in the earthquake zone.

The TOPEX/Poseidon and Jason-1 satellites happened to pass over the tsunami as it was crossing the ocean. Measurements from these satellites may prove invaluable for the understanding of the earthquake and tsunami. Unlike data from tide gauges installed on shores, measurements obtained in the middle of the ocean can be used for computing the parameters of the source earthquake without having to compensate for the complex ways in which proximity to the coast changes the size and shape of a wave.

Tsunami

The sudden vertical rise of the seabed by several metres during the earthquake displaced massive volumes of water, resulting in a tsunami that struck the coasts of the Indian Ocean. A tsunami that causes damage far away from its source is sometimes called a teletsunami and is much more likely to be produced by the vertical motion of the seabed than by horizontal motion.

The tsunami, like all others, behaved differently in deep water than in shallow water. Radar satellites recorded the heights of tsunami waves in deep water: maximum height was at  two hours after the earthquake, the first such observations ever made.

Because the  fault affected by the earthquake was in a nearly north–south orientation, the greatest strength of the tsunami waves was in an east–west direction. Bangladesh, which lies at the northern end of the Bay of Bengal, had few casualties despite being a low-lying country relatively near the epicentre. It also benefited from the fact that the earthquake proceeded more slowly in the northern rupture zone, greatly reducing the energy of the water displacements in that region.

Coasts that have a landmass between them and the tsunami's location of origin are usually safe; however, tsunami waves can sometimes diffract around such landmasses. Thus, the state of Kerala was hit by the tsunami despite being on the western coast of India, and the western coast of Sri Lanka suffered substantial impacts. Distance alone was no guarantee of safety, as Somalia was hit harder than Bangladesh despite being much farther away.

Because of the distances involved, the tsunami took anywhere from fifteen minutes to seven hours to reach the coastlines. The northern regions of the Indonesian island of Sumatra were hit quickly, while Sri Lanka and the east coast of India were hit roughly 90 minutes to two hours later. Thailand was struck about two hours later despite being closer to the epicentre because the tsunami travelled more slowly in the shallow Andaman Sea off its western coast.

It took a relatively long time to reach Struisbaai at the southernmost point of Africa, probably because of the broad continental shelf off South Africa and because the tsunami would have followed the South African coast from east to west. The tsunami also reached Antarctica, where tidal gauges at Japan's Showa Base recorded oscillations of up to a metre, with disturbances lasting a couple of days.

At Manzanillo, Mexico, a  crest-to-trough tsunami was measured. As well, the tsunami was large enough to be detected in Vancouver, which puzzled many scientists, as the tsunamis measured in some parts of South America were larger than those measured in some parts of the Indian Ocean. It has been theorized that the tsunamis were focused and directed at long ranges by the mid-ocean ridges which run along the margins of the continental plates.

Early signs and warnings

Despite a delay of up to several hours between the earthquake and the impact of the tsunami, nearly all of the victims were taken by surprise. There were no tsunami warning systems in the Indian Ocean to detect tsunamis or to warn the general population living around the ocean. Tsunami detection is not easy because while a tsunami is in deep water, it has little height and a network of sensors is needed to detect it.

Tsunamis are more frequent in the Pacific Ocean than in other oceans because of earthquakes in the "Ring of Fire". Although the extreme western edge of the Ring of Fire extends into the Indian Ocean (the point where the earthquake struck), no warning system exists in that ocean. Tsunamis there are relatively rare despite earthquakes being relatively frequent in Indonesia. The last major tsunami was caused by the 1883 eruption of Krakatoa. Not every earthquake produces large tsunamis: on 28 March 2005, a magnitude 8.7 earthquake hit roughly the same area of the Indian Ocean but did not result in a major tsunami.

The first warning sign of a possible tsunami is the earthquake itself. However, tsunamis can strike thousands of kilometres away where the earthquake is felt only weakly or not at all. Also, in the minutes preceding a tsunami strike, the sea sometimes recedes temporarily from the coast, which was observed on the eastern earthquake rupture zone such as the coastlines of Aceh, Phuket island, and Khao Lak area in Thailand, Penang island of Malaysia, and the Andaman and Nicobar islands. However, not all tsunamis cause this "disappearing sea" effect. In some cases, there are no warning signs at all: the sea will suddenly swell without retreating, surprising many people and giving them little time to flee.

One of the few coastal areas to evacuate ahead of the tsunami was on the Indonesian island of Simeulue, close to the epicentre. Island folklore recounted an earthquake and tsunami in 1907, and the islanders fled to inland hills after the initial shaking and before the tsunami struck. These tales and oral folklore from previous generations may have helped the survival of the inhabitants. On Maikhao Beach in north Phuket City, Thailand, a 10-year-old British tourist named Tilly Smith had studied tsunamis in geography at school and recognised the warning signs of the receding ocean and frothing bubbles. She and her parents warned others on the beach, which was evacuated safely. John Chroston, a biology teacher from Scotland, also recognised the signs at Kamala Bay north of Phuket, taking a busload of vacationers and locals to safety on higher ground.

Anthropologists had initially expected the aboriginal population of the Andaman Islands to be badly affected by the tsunami and even feared the already depopulated Onge tribe could have been wiped out. Many of the aboriginal tribes evacuated and suffered fewer casualties, however. Oral traditions developed from previous earthquakes helped the aboriginal tribes escape the tsunami. For example, the folklore of the Onges talks of "huge shaking of ground followed by high wall of water". Almost all of the Onge people seemed to have survived the tsunami.

Indonesia

Aceh

The tsunami devastated the coastline of Aceh province, about 20 minutes after the earthquake. Banda Aceh, the closest major city, suffered severe casualties. The sea receded and exposed the seabed, prompting locals to collect stranded fish and explore the area. Local eyewitnesses described three large waves, with the first wave rising gently to the foundation of the buildings, followed minutes later by a sudden withdrawal of the sea near the port of Ulee Lheue. This was succeeded by the appearance of two large black-coloured steep waves which then travelled inland into the capital city as a large turbulent bore. Eyewitnesses described the tsunami as a "black giant", "mountain" and a "wall of water". Additionally, amateur footage recorded in the middle of the city captured an approaching black surge flowing down the city streets, full of debris, inundating them.

The level of destruction was extreme on the northwestern areas of the city, immediately inland of the aquaculture ponds, and directly facing the Indian Ocean. Within  of the shoreline, houses, except for strongly-built reinforced concrete ones with brick walls, which seemed to have been partially damaged by the earthquake before the tsunami attack, were swept away or destroyed by the tsunami.
The area toward the sea was wiped clean of nearly every structure, while closer to the river, dense construction in a commercial district showed the effects of severe flooding. The flow depth at the city was just at the level of the second floor, and there were large amounts of debris piled along the streets and in the ground-floor storefronts.

A group of small islands: Weh, Breueh, Nasi, Teunom, Bunta, Lumpat, and Batee lie just north of the capital city. Coastal villages were destroyed by the waves.

The locals reported 10 to 12 waves, with the second and third being the highest and most destructive. Interviews with the locals revealed that the sea temporarily receded and exposed coral reefs.
The second wave was the largest; it came from the west-southwest within five minutes of the first wave. The tsunami stranded cargo ships, barges and destroyed a cement mining facility near the Lampuuk coast, where it reached the fourth level of the building.

Meulaboh, a remote coastal city, was among the hardest hit by the tsunami. The second and third destructive waves arrived later, which exceeded the height of the coconut trees. Other towns on Aceh's west coast hit by the disaster included Leupung, Lhokruet, Lamno, Patek, Calang, and Teunom. Affected or destroyed towns on the region's north and east coast were Pidie Regency, Samalanga, Panteraja, and Lhokseumawe. The high fatality rate in the area was mainly due to lack of preparation of the community towards a tsunami and limited knowledge and education among the population regarding the natural phenomenon. Helicopter surveys showed entire settlements virtually destroyed with destruction within miles inland, and only some mosques left standing.

The greatest run-up height of the tsunami was measured at a hill between Lhoknga and Leupung, on the western coast of the northern tip of Sumatra, near Banda Aceh, and reached .

The tsunami heights in Sumatra:
  on the west coast of Aceh
  on the Banda Aceh coast
  on the Krueng Raya coast
  on the Sigli coast
  on the north coast of Weh Island directly facing the tsunami source
  on the opposite side of the coast of Weh Island facing the tsunami

Sri Lanka

The tsunami first struck the eastern coastline and subsequently refracted around the southern point of Sri Lanka (Dondra Head). The refracted tsunami waves then inundated the southwestern part of Sri Lanka after some of its energy was reflected from impact with the Maldives. In Sri Lanka, the civilian casualties were second only to those in Indonesia, with approximately 35,000 killed. The eastern shores of Sri Lanka were the hardest hit since it faced the epicentre of the earthquake, while the southwestern shores were hit later, but the death toll was just as severe. The southwestern shores are a hotspot for tourists and fishing. The degradation of the natural environment in Sri Lanka contributed to the high death tolls. Approximately 90,000 buildings and many wooden houses were destroyed.

The tsunami arrived on the island as a small brown-orange-colored flood. Amateur video recorded at the city of Galle showed a large deluge flooding the city, carrying debris and sweeping away people while in the coastal resort town of Beruwala, the tsunami appeared as a huge brown-orange colored bore which reached the first level of a hotel, causing destruction and taking people unaware. Other videos recorded showed that the tsunami appeared like a flood raging inland. The construction of seawalls and breakwaters reduced the power of waves at some locations.

Sri Lanka tsunami height survey:
  at Koggala
  at Galle port
  around the Galle coast
  at Nonagama
  at Weligama
  at Dodundawa
  at Ambalangoda
  at Hikkaduwa Fishery Harbour
  at Kahawa
  at North Beach of Beruwala
  at Paiyagala

A regular passenger train operating between Maradana and Matara was derailed and overturned by the tsunami and claimed at least 1,700 lives, the largest single rail disaster death toll in history.

Thailand
The tsunami travelled eastward through the Andaman Sea and hit the south-western coasts of Thailand, about 2 hours after the earthquake. Many of these tourists were caught off-guard by the tsunami, as they had no prior warning. The tsunami hit during high tide. Major locations damaged included the western shores of Phuket island, the resort town of Khao Lak in Phang Nga Province, the coastal provinces of Krabi, Satun, Ranong and Trang and small offshore islands like Ko Racha Yai, the Phi Phi islands, the Surin Islands and the Similan archipelago. Approximately 8,000 people were killed.

Thailand experienced the second largest tsunami run-up. The tsunami heights recorded:

  in Khao Lak
  along the west coast of Phuket island
  along the south coast of Phuket island
  along the east coast of Phuket island
  on the Phi Phi Islands
  at Ban Thung Dap
  at Ramson
  at Ban Thale Nok
  at Hat Praphat (Ranong Coastal Resources Research Station)
  at Thai Mueang District
  at Rai Dan

The province of Phang Nga was the most affected area in Thailand. The quiet resort town of Khao Lak is located on a stretch of golden sandy beach, famed for its hotels overlooking the Andaman Sea and hilly rainforests. A video, taken by a local restaurant manager from a hill adjacent to the beach, showed that the tsunami's arrival was preceded by a sudden retreat of the sea exposing the seafloor. Many tourists and locals can be seen trying to gather fish. Moments later, the tsunami arrives as a wall of foaming water that slams into the coast, washing away numerous people who had no time to escape. Another amateur video, captured by a German family at beach level, showed the tsunami appearing as a white horizontal line in the distant horizon, gradually becoming bigger (bore-like), engulfing a jet skier and lifting two police boats. The tsunami in Khao Lak was bigger due to offshore coral reefs and shallow seafloor which caused the tsunami to pile-up. This was similar to eyewitness accounts of the tsunami at Banda Aceh.

Khao Lak also experienced the largest tsunami run-up height outside of Sumatra.. Moreover, the largest death toll occurred at Khao Lak, with about 5,000 people killed.

In addition, the tsunami inflicted damage to the popular resort town of Ao Nang in Krabi Province. Video footage showed that the tsunami appeared as multiple white surfs violently lifting up yachts, boats and crashing onto beaches. Footage captured at Koh Lanta showed a wall of water swamping  the beach, while another video taken at another location showed a large surfing wave like tsunami approaching the shore, lifting up a yacht and flooding the beach. At Koh Sriboya, the tsunami advanced inland as a turbulent medium bore, while at Koh Phayam, Ranong Province, the tsunami appeared as a wall of water.

At Phuket Province, the island province's western beaches were struck by the tsunami. At Patong Beach, a popular tourist destination, the tsunami first arrived as a small flood, which swept away cars and surprised people. About 10 minutes later, the sea receded for a while before the tsunami arrived again as a large wall of water looming over the skyline and flooding the coast. Another video from Kamala Beach showed the tsunami flooding the ground floor of a restaurant sweeping away an elderly couple. On Karon Beach, Kamala Beach and Kata Beach, the tsunami came in like a surging flood inland carrying people and cars. On some locations, a coastal road was built which was higher than the shore, protecting a hotel which was behind it. On the east coast of Phuket Island, the tsunami height was about 2 m. In one river mouth, many boats were damaged. The tsunami moved counter-clockwise around Phuket Island, as was the case at Okushiri Island in the 1993 Hokkaido earthquake. According to interviews, the second wave was the largest. The tsunami surprised many tourists at Koh Racha Yai, where it flooded the resorts. About 250 people perished directly in the tsunami.

The Phi Phi Islands are a group of small islands that were affected by the tsunami. The north bay of Phi Phi Don Island opens to the north-west in the direction of the tsunami. According to eyewitness accounts, the tsunami came from the north and south. The ground level was about 2 m above sea level, where there were many cottages and hotels. The south bay opens to the south-east and faces in the opposite direction from the tsunami. Furthermore, Phi Phi Le Island shields the port of Phi Phi Don Island. Amateur camcorder footage taken by Israeli tourists showed the tsunami advancing inland suddenly as a small flood, gradually becoming more powerful and engulfing the whole beach and resort, with the tsunami carrying a yacht out to sea.

Moreover, the tsunami was detected by scuba divers around offshore islands like the Similan Islands and the Surin Islands. The divers reported being caught in a violent, swirling current suddenly while underwater. Local camcorder footage showed the tsunami surging inland and flooding camping equipment at the Similan Islands while the tsunami caught tourists unaware at the Surin Islands, and dragging them out towards the sea.

India

The tsunami reached the states of Andhra Pradesh and Tamil Nadu along the southeastern coastline of the Indian mainland about 2 hours after the earthquake. At the same time, it arrived in the state of Kerala, on the southwestern coast. There were two to five tsunamis that coincided with the local high tide in some areas.

The tsunami runup height measured in mainland India by Ministry of Home Affairs includes:

Along the coast of Tamil Nadu, the  Marina Beach in Chennai was battered by the tsunami which swept across the beach taking morning walkers unaware. Amateur video recorded taken at a resort beach showed the tsunami arriving as a large wall of water as it approached the coast and flooding it as it advanced inland. Besides that, a  black muddy tsunami ravaged the city of Karaikal, where 492 people died. The city of Pondicherry, protected by seawalls was relatively unscathed. Local video recorded that before the arrival of the tsunami, people can be seen swarming the beach to check on stranded fish from the exposed beach. Furthermore, at the coastal town of Kanyakumari, the seabed was exposed briefly before a large wall of water can be seen on the horizon and subsequently flooding the town. Other footage showed the tsunami dramatically crashed into the Vivekananda Rock Memorial. The worst affected area in Tamil Nadu was Nagapattinam district, with 6,051 fatalities caused by a  tsunami, followed by Cuddalore district, with many villages destroyed. Most of the people killed were members of the fishing community. Velankanni a sea shore town with a Catholic Basilica and a popular pilgrimage destination was also one of the worst hit by this tsunami that struck at around 9.30 am on that Sunday, when pilgrims who were mostly from Kerala among others were inside the church attending the Malayalam Mass. The rising sea water did not enter the shrine, but the receding waters swept away hundreds of pilgrims who were on the beach. The shrine's compound, nearby villages, hundreds of shops, homes and pilgrims were washed away into the sea. About 600 pilgrims died. Rescue teams extricated more than 400 bodies from the sand and rocks in the vicinity and large number of unidentified bodies were buried in mass graves.

The state of Kerala experienced tsunami-related damage in three southern densely populated districts, Ernakulam, Alappuzha, and Kollam, due to diffraction of the waves around Sri Lanka. The southernmost district of Thiruvananthapuram, however, escaped damage, possibly due to the wide turn of the diffracted waves at the peninsular tip. Major damage occurred in two narrow strips of land bound on the west by the Arabian Sea and on the east by the Kerala backwaters. The waves receded before the first tsunami with the highest fatality reported from the densely populated Alappad panchayat (including the villages of Cheriya Azhikkal and Azhikkal) at Kollam district, caused by a  tsunami. A video recorded by locals showed the tsunami flooding the beach and villages, causing despair amongst the villagers.

Many villages in the state of Andhra Pradesh were destroyed. In the Krishna district, the tsunami created havoc in Manginapudi and on Machalipattanam Beach. The most affected was Prakasham District, recording 35 deaths, with maximum damage at Singraikonda. Given the enormous power of the tsunami, the fishing industry suffered the greatest. Moreover, the cost of damage in the transport sector was reported in the tens of thousands.

The time between the waves ranged from about 15 minutes to 90 minutes. The tsunami travelled  at its maximum inland at Karaikal, Puducherry. Areas with dense coconut groves or mangroves had much smaller inundation distances, and those with river mouths or backwaters saw larger inundation distances. Presence of seawalls at the Kerala and Tamil Nadu coasts reduced the impact of the waves. However, when the seawalls were made of loose stones, the stones were displaced and carried a few metres inland.

Andaman and Nicobar Islands

Due to close proximity to the earthquake, the tsunami took just minutes to devastate the Andaman and Nicobar Islands. The Andaman Islands were moderately affected while the island of Little Andaman and the Nicobar Islands were severely affected by the tsunami.

In South Andaman island, based on local eyewitnesses, there were three tsunami waves, with the third being the most destructive. Flooding occurred at the coast and low-lying areas inland, which were connected to open sea through creeks. Inundation was observed, along the east coast of South Andaman Island, restricted to Chidiyatapu, Burmanallah, Kodiaghat, Beadnabad, Corbyn's cove and Marina Park/Aberdeen Jetty areas. Along the west coast, the inundation was observed around Guptapara, Manjeri, Wandoor, Collinpur and Tirur regions. Several near-shore establishments and numerous infrastructures such as seawalls and a 20 MW diesel-generated power plant at Bamboo Flat were destroyed. At Port Blair, the water receded before the first wave, and the third wave was the tallest and caused the most damage.

Results of the tsunami survey in South Andaman along Chiriyatapu, Corbyn's Cove and Wandoor beaches:
  in maximum tsunami height and run-up at Corbyn's Cove Beach

Run up level up to  have been measured.

In Malacca, located on the island of Car Nicobar, there were three tsunami waves. The sea was observed to rise suddenly before the onset of the first wave. The first wave came 5 minutes after the earthquake, preceded by a recession of the sea up to .. The second and third waves came in 10 minutes intervals after the first wave. Waves nearly three stories high devastated the Indian Air Force base, located just south of Malacca. The impact of the waves was so severe that four oil tankers were thrown almost  from the seashore near Malacca to the Air force colony main gate.

A rise in sea level was observed before the first wave came within 5 minutes of the earthquake. The second and third waves came in 10-minute intervals after the first. The second wave was the strongest. According to local accounts, tsunami waves attacked the area three times. The first wave came five minutes after the mainshock (0629 hrs.) with a marginal drop in sea level. The third wave came within 15 minutes after the second with lower wave height.

The worst affected island in the Andaman & Nicobar chain is Katchall Island, with 303 people confirmed dead and 4,354 missing out of a total population of 5,312. The significant shielding of Port Blair and Campbell Bay by steep mountainous outcrops contributed to the relatively low wave heights at these locations, whereas the open terrain along the eastern coast at Malacca and Hut Bay contributed to the great height of the tsunami waves.

Reports of tsunami wave height:

  at Diglipur and Rangat at North Andaman Island
  high at Campbell Bay on Great Nicobar Island
  high at Malacca (in Car Nicobar Island) and at Hut Bay on Little Andaman Island
  high at Port Blair on South Andaman Island

Maldives
Similar to Sri Lanka, survivors reported three waves with the second wave being the most powerful. Being rich in coral reefs, the Maldives provides an opportunity for scientists to assess the impact of a tsunami on coral atolls. The significantly lower tsunami impact on the Maldives compared to Sri Lanka is mostly due to the topography and bathymetry of the atoll chain with offshore coral reefs, deep channels separating individual atolls and its arrival within low tide which decreased the power of the tsunami. After the tsunami, there was some concern that the country might be submerged entirely and become uninhabitable. However, this was proven untrue.
The tsunami arrived approximately 2 hours after the earthquake. The greatest tsunami inundation occurred at North Male Atoll, Male island at  along the streets.

Local footage recorded showed the tsunami flooding the streets up to knee level in town, while another video taken at the beach showed the tsunami slowly flooding and gradually surging inland.

The Maldives tsunami wave analysis:
  at North Male Atoll, Male Island
  at North Male Atoll, Huhule Island
  at South Male Atoll, Embudhu Finothu
  at Laamu Atoll, Fonadhoo Island
  at Laamu Atoll, Gan Island
  at North Male Atoll, Dhiffushi Island
  at North Male Atoll, Huraa Island

Myanmar
In Myanmar, the tsunami caused only moderate damage, which arrived between 2 and 5.5 hours after the earthquake. Although the country's western Andaman Sea coastline lies at the proximity of the rupture zone, there were smaller tsunamis than the neighbouring Thai coast, because the main tsunami source did not extend to the Andaman Islands. Another factor is that some coasts of Taninthayi Division were protected by the Myeik Archipelago. Eyewitnesses compared the tsunami with the "rainy-season high tide"; although at most locations, the tsunami height was similar or smaller than the "rainy-season high tide" level.

Tsunami survey heights:
  around the Ayeyarwady delta
  at Dawei area
  around Myeik
  around Kawthaung

Interviews with local people indicate that they did not feel the earthquake in Taninthayi Division or Ayeyarwaddy Delta. The 71 casualties can be attributed to poor housing infrastructure and additionally, the fact that the coastal residents in the surveyed areas live on flat land along the coast, especially in the Ayeyarwaddy Delta, and that there is no higher ground to which to evacuate. The tsunami heights from the 2004 December earthquake were not more than  along the Myanmar coast, the amplitudes were slightly large off the Ayeyarwaddy Delta, probably because the shallow delta caused a concentration in tsunami energy.

Somalia
Around 289 fatalities were reported in the Horn of Africa, drowned by four tsunami waves. The hardest-hit was a  stretch of the Somalia coastline between Garacad (Mudug region) and Xaafuun (Bari region), which forms part of the Puntland province. Most of the victims were reported along the low-lying Xaafuun Peninsula. The Puntland coast in northern Somalia was by far the area hardest hit by the waves to the west of the Indian subcontinent. The waves arrived around noon local time.

The maximum runup height of almost  was recorded in Bandarbeyla. An even higher runup point was measured on a cliff near the town of Eyl, solely on an eyewitness account.

The highest death toll was in Hafun, with 19 dead and 160 people presumed missing out of its 5,000 inhabitants. This was the highest number of casualties in a single African town and the largest tsunami death toll in a single town to the west of the Indian subcontinent. In Xaafuun, small drawbacks were observed before the third and most powerful tsunami wave flooded the town.

Other locations

The tsunami also reached Malaysia, mainly on the northern states such as Kedah, Perak and Penang and on offshore islands such as Langkawi island. Peninsular Malaysia was shielded by the full force of the tsunami due to the protection offered by the island of Sumatra, which lies just off the western coast.

Bangladesh escaped major damage and deaths because the water displaced by the strike-slip fault was relatively little on the northern section of the rupture zone, which ruptured slowly.

The tsunami was detected in the southern parts of east Africa, where rough seas were reported, specifically on the eastern and southern coasts that face the Indian Ocean. A few other African countries also recorded fatalities; one in Kenya, three in Seychelles, ten in Tanzania, and South Africa, where two were killed as a direct result of the tsunami—the furthest from the epicentre.

Tidal surges also occurred along the Western Australian coast that lasted for several hours, resulting in boats losing their moorings and two people needing to be rescued.

Impact

Countries affected

According to the U.S. Geological Survey, a total of 227,898 people died. Measured in lives lost, this is one of the ten worst earthquakes in recorded history, as well as the single worst tsunami in history. Indonesia was the worst affected area, with most death toll estimates at around 170,000. An initial report by Siti Fadilah Supari, the Indonesian Minister of Health at the time, estimated the death total to be as high as 220,000 in Indonesia alone, giving a total of 280,000 fatalities. However, the estimated number of dead and missing in Indonesia were later reduced by over 50,000. In their report, the Tsunami Evaluation Coalition stated, "It should be remembered that all such data are subject to error, as data on missing persons especially are not always as good as one might wish". A much higher number of deaths has been suggested for Myanmar based on reports from Thailand.

The tsunami caused severe damage and deaths as far as the east coast of Africa, with the furthest recorded fatality directly attributed to the tsunami at Rooi-Els, close to Cape Town,  from the epicentre.

Relief agencies reported that one third of the dead appeared to be children. This was a result of the high proportion of children in the populations of many of the affected regions and because children were the least able to resist being overcome by the surging waters. Oxfam went on to report that as many as four times more women than men were killed in some regions because they were waiting on the beach for the fishers to return and looking after their children in the houses.

States of emergency were declared in Sri Lanka, Indonesia, and the Maldives. The United Nations estimated at the outset that the relief operation would be the costliest in human history. Then-UN Secretary-General Kofi Annan stated that reconstruction would probably take between five and ten years. Governments and non-governmental organizations feared that the final death toll might double as a result of diseases, prompting a massive humanitarian response.

In addition to a large number of local residents, up to 9,000 foreign tourists (mostly Europeans) enjoying the peak holiday travel season were among the dead or missing, especially people from the Nordic countries. Sweden was the European country most severely affected both in absolute numbers, and by a wide margin when considered in relation to the country's population, with a death toll of 543. Germany was close behind with 539 identified victims.

Environmental impact

Beyond the heavy toll on human lives, the Indian Ocean earthquake has caused an enormous environmental impact that will affect the region for many years to come. Severe damage was inflicted on ecosystems such as mangroves, coral reefs, forests, coastal wetlands, vegetation, sand dunes and rock formations, animal and plant biodiversity and groundwater. Also, the spread of solid and liquid waste and industrial chemicals, water pollution and the destruction of sewage collectors and treatment plants threaten the environment even further, in untold ways. The environmental impact took a long time and significant resources to assess.

The main effect was caused by poisoning of the freshwater supplies and of the soil by saltwater infiltration and a deposit of a salt layer over arable land. In the Maldives, 16 to 17 coral reef atolls that were overcome by sea waves are without fresh water and could be rendered uninhabitable for decades. Uncountable wells that served communities were invaded by sea, sand, and earth; and aquifers were invaded through porous rock. On the island's east coast, the tsunami contaminated wells on which many villagers relied for drinking water.

The Colombo-based International Water Management Institute monitored the effects of saltwater and concluded that the wells recovered to pre-tsunami drinking water quality one-and-a-half years after the event. 
The IWMI developed protocols for cleaning wells contaminated by saltwater; these were subsequently officially endorsed by the World Health Organization as part of its series of Emergency Guidelines.

Salted-over soil becomes sterile, and it is difficult and costly to restore for agriculture. It also causes the death of plants and important soil micro-organisms. Thousands of rice, mango, and banana plantations in Sri Lanka were destroyed almost entirely and will take years to recover.

In addition to other forms of aid, the Australian government sent ecological experts to help develop strategies for reef-monitoring and rehabilitation of marine environments and coral reefs in the Maldives, Seychelles and other areas. Scientists had developed significant ecological expertise from work with the Great Barrier Reef, in Australia's northeastern waters.

In response to the unprecedented situation, the United Nations Environment Programme (UNEP) worked with governments in the region to determine the severity of the ecological impact and how to address it. UNEP established an emergency fund, set up  a Task Force to respond to requests for assistance from countries affected by the tsunami, and was able to mobilize and distribute approximately US$9.3 million for environmental recovery and disaster risk reduction between 2004 and 2007. Funding came from other international agencies and from countries including Finland, Norway,  Spain, Sweden and the United Kingdom.

Evidence suggested that the presence of mangroves in coastal areas had provided some protection, when compared to areas that had been cleared for aquaculture or development. As a result, mangrove restoration become a focus of a number of projects, with varied success. Such approaches to ecosystem-based disaster risk reduction appear to be most successful when local communities are closely involved as stakeholders throughout the process, and when careful attention is paid to the physical conditions of chosen sites to ensure that mangroves can thrive there.

Economic impact

The level of damage to the economy resulting from the tsunami depends on the scale examined. While the overall impact on the national economies was minor, local economies were devastated. The two main occupations affected by the tsunami were fishing and tourism. 
Some economists believe that damage to the affected national economies will be minor because losses in the tourism and fishing industries are a relatively small percentage of the GDP. However, others caution that damage to infrastructure is an overriding factor. In some areas drinking water supplies and farm fields may have been contaminated for years by saltwater from the ocean.

The impact on coastal fishing communities and the people living there, some of the poorest in the region, has been devastating with high losses of income earners as well as boats and fishing gear. In Sri Lanka, artisanal fishery, in which the use of fish baskets, fishing traps, and spears are commonly used, is an important source of fish for local markets; industrial fishery is the major economic activity, providing direct employment to about 250,000 people. In recent years the fishery industry has emerged as a dynamic export-oriented sector, generating substantial foreign exchange earnings. Preliminary estimates indicated that 66% of the fishing fleet and industrial infrastructure in coastal regions were destroyed by the wave surges.

While the tsunami destroyed many of the boats vital to Sri Lanka's fishing industry, it also created a demand for fibreglass-reinforced plastic catamarans in the boatyards of Tamil Nadu. Given that over 51,000 vessels were lost to the tsunami, the industry boomed. However, the huge demand has led to lower quality in the process, and some important materials were sacrificed to cut prices for those who were impoverished by the tsunami.

Even though only coastal regions were directly affected by the waters of the tsunami, the indirect effects have spread to inland provinces as well. Since the media coverage of the event was so extensive, many tourists cancelled vacations and trips to that part of the world, even though their travel destinations may not have been affected. This ripple effect could especially be felt in the inland provinces of Thailand, such as Krabi, which acted as a starting point for many other tourist destinations in Thailand.

Countries in the region appealed to tourists to return, pointing out that most tourist infrastructure is undamaged. However, tourists were reluctant to do so for psychological reasons. Even beach resorts in parts of Thailand which were untouched by the tsunami were hit by cancellations.

Both the earthquake and the tsunami may have affected shipping in the Malacca Straits, which separate Malaysia and the Indonesian island of Sumatra, by changing the depth of the seabed and by disturbing navigational buoys and old shipwrecks. These problems also made the delivery of relief aid more challenging. Compiling new navigational charts may take months or years. Officials also hoped that piracy in the region would drop off, since the tsunami had killed pirates and destroyed their boats. Due to multiple factors, there was a 71.6% drop in the number of piracy incidents between 2004 and 2005, from 60  to  17 incidents. Levels remained relatively low for some years. However, between 2013 and 2014, piracy incidents rose dramatically by 73.2% to exceed pre-tsunami levels.

Historical context

The last major tsunami in the Indian Ocean was about A.D. 1400. In 2008, a team of scientists working on Phra Thong, a barrier island along the hard-hit west coast of Thailand, reported evidence of at least three previous major tsunamis in the preceding 2,800 years, the most recent from about 700 years ago. A second team found similar evidence of previous tsunamis in Aceh, a province at the northern tip of Sumatra; radiocarbon dating of bark fragments in the soil below the second sand layer led the scientists to estimate that the most recent predecessor to the 2004 tsunami probably occurred between A.D. 1300 and 1450.

The 2004 earthquake and tsunami combined is the world's deadliest natural disaster since the 1976 Tangshan earthquake. The earthquake was the third-most-powerful earthquake recorded since 1900. The deadliest-known earthquake in history occurred in 1556 in Shaanxi, China, with an estimated death toll of 830,000, though figures from this period may not be as reliable.

Before 2004, the tsunami created in both Indian and Pacific Ocean waters by the 1883 eruption of Krakatoa, thought to have resulted in anywhere from 36,000 to 120,000 deaths, had probably been the deadliest in the region. In 1782, about 40,000 people are thought to have been killed by a tsunami (or a cyclone) in the South China Sea.  The deadliest tsunami before 2004 was Italy's 1908 Messina earthquake on the Mediterranean Sea where the earthquake and tsunami killed about 123,000.

Other effects

Many health professionals and aid workers have reported widespread psychological trauma associated with the tsunami. Traditional beliefs in many of the affected regions state that a relative of the family must bury the body of the dead, and in many cases, no body remained to be buried. Women in Aceh required a special approach from foreign aid agencies, and continue to have unique needs.

The hardest-hit area, Aceh, is a religiously conservative Islamic society and has had no tourism nor any Western presence in recent years due to the insurgency between the Indonesian military and Free Aceh Movement (GAM). Some believe that the tsunami was divine punishment for lay Muslims shirking their daily prayers or following a materialistic lifestyle. Others have said that Allah was angry that Muslims were killing each other in an ongoing conflict. Saudi cleric Muhammad Al-Munajjid attributed it to divine retribution against non-Muslim vacationers "who used to sprawl all over the beaches and in pubs overflowing with wine" during Christmas break.

The widespread devastation caused by the tsunami led GAM to declare a cease-fire on 28 December 2004 followed by the Indonesian government, and the two groups resumed long-stalled peace talks, which resulted in a peace agreement signed 15 August 2005. The agreement explicitly cites the tsunami as a justification.

In a poll conducted in 27 countries, 15% of respondents named the tsunami the most significant event of the year. Only the Iraq War was named by as many respondents. The extensive international media coverage of the tsunami, and the role of mass media and journalists in reconstruction, were discussed by editors of newspapers and broadcast media in tsunami-affected areas, in special video-conferences set up by the Asia Pacific Journalism Centre.

The tsunami left both the people and government of India in a state of heightened alert. On 30 December 2004, four days after the tsunami, Terra Research notified the India government that its sensors indicated there was a possibility of 7.9 to 8.1 magnitude tectonic shift in the next 12 hours between Sumatra and New Zealand. In response, the Indian Minister of Home Affairs announced that a fresh onslaught of deadly tsunami was likely along the southern Indian coast and the Andaman and Nicobar Islands, even as there was no sign of turbulence in the region. The announcement generated panic in the Indian Ocean region and caused thousands to flee their homes, which resulted in jammed roads. The announcement was a false alarm, and the Home Affairs minister withdrew their announcement. On further investigation, the India government learned that the consulting company Terra Research was run from the home of a self-described earthquake forecaster who had no telephone listing and maintained a website where he sold copies of his detection system.

The tsunami had a severe humanitarian and political impact in Sweden. The hardest-hit country outside Asia, Sweden, lost 543 tourists, mainly in Thailand. The Persson Cabinet was heavily criticized for its inaction.

Smith Dharmasaroja, a meteorologist who had predicted that an earthquake and tsunami "is going to occur for sure" way back in 1994, was assigned the development of the Thai tsunami warning system. The Indian Ocean Tsunami warning system was formed in early 2005 to provide an early warning of tsunamis for inhabitants around the Indian Ocean coasts.

The changes in the distribution of masses inside the Earth due to the earthquake had several consequences. It also slightly changed the shape of the Earth, specifically by decreasing Earth's oblateness by about one part in 10 billion, consequentially increasing Earth's rotation a little and thus shortening the length of the day by 2.68 microseconds.

Humanitarian response

A great deal of humanitarian aid was needed because of widespread damage to the infrastructure, shortages of food and water, and economic damage. Epidemics were of particular concern due to the high population density and tropical climate of the affected areas.

There was also a great concern that the death toll could increase as disease and hunger spread. However, because of the initial quick response, this was minimized.

In the days following the tsunami, significant effort was spent in burying bodies hurriedly due to fear of disease spreading. However, the public health risks may have been exaggerated, and therefore this may not have been the best way to allocate resources. The World Food Programme provided food aid to more than 1.3 million people affected by the tsunami.

Nations all over the world provided over US$14 billion in aid for damaged regions, with the governments of Australia pledging US$819.9 million (including a US$760.6 million aid package for Indonesia), Germany offering US$660 million, Japan offering US$500 million, Canada offering US$343 million, Norway and the Netherlands offering both US$183 million, the United States offering US$35 million initially (increased to US$350 million), and the World Bank offering US$250 million. Also, Italy offered US$95 million, increased later to US$113 million of which US$42 million was donated by the population using the SMS system
Australia, India, Japan and the United States formed an ad-hoc corroborative group, and it was the origin of Quadrilateral Security Dialogue.

According to USAID, the US has pledged additional funds in long-term U.S. support to help the tsunami victims rebuild their lives. On 9 February 2005, President Bush asked Congress to increase the U.S. commitment to a total of US$950 million. Officials estimated that billions of dollars would be needed. Bush also asked his father, former President George H. W. Bush, and former President Bill Clinton to lead a U.S. effort to provide private aid to the tsunami victims.

In mid-March, the Asian Development Bank reported that over US$4 billion in aid promised by governments was behind schedule. Sri Lanka reported that it had received no foreign government aid, while foreign individuals had been generous. Many charities were given considerable donations from the public. For example, in the United Kingdom, the public donated roughly £330 million sterling (nearly US$600 million). This considerably outweighed the allocation by the government to disaster relief and reconstruction of £75 million and came to an average of about £5.50 (US$10) donated by every citizen.

In August 2006, fifteen local aid staff working on post-tsunami rebuilding were found executed in north-east Sri Lanka after heavy fighting between government troops and the Tamil Tiger rebels, the main umbrella body for aid agencies in the country said.

In popular culture

Film and television
 Children of Tsunami: No More Tears (2005), a 24-minute documentary
 The Wave That Shook The World (2005), educational television-series documentary about the tsunami
 Tsunami: The Aftermath (2006), a two-part television miniseries about its aftermath
 Dasavathaaram (2008), a Tamil thriller film involving the tsunami
 Hereafter (2010), a main character's life is affected after surviving the tsunami while on vacation
 Hafalan Shalat Delisa (2011), an Indonesian movie
 The Impossible (2012), an English-language Spanish film based on the story of María Belón and her family
 Kayal (2014), a Tamil drama film which culminates with the tsunami

Literature
 Paint the Sky with Stars, Selected Poetry in Remembrance of the Boxing Day Tsunami 2004 (2005) edited by Stephen Robert Kuta
The Killing Sea (2006), two teenagers struggle to survive in the days after the tsunami
Wave (2013), a memoir by Sonali Deraniyagala

Music
 "12/26" by Kimya Dawson, about the event and the humanitarian efforts, from the perspective of a victim whose family died in the disaster

See also

 Deaths in December 2004 – notable people killed in the 2004 Indian Ocean tsunami
 List of earthquakes in 2004
 List of earthquakes in Indonesia
 List of natural disasters by death toll
 Lists of earthquakes
 List of megathrust earthquakes

References

External links

 
 The Sumatra-Andaman Islands Earthquake – IRIS Consortium
 M9.1 Sumatra-Andaman Earthquake & Tsunami, 2004 – Amateur Seismic Centre (ASC)
 Asian Tsunami Anniversary – Thailand Tsunami Then and Now Comparison Series – Zoriah Miller
 
 

 
2004 disasters in India
2004 disasters in Sri Lanka
Earthquakes in Sumatra
2004 earthquakes
2004 in India
2004 in Indonesia
2004 in Sri Lanka
2004 in the Maldives
2004 in Somalia
2004 in Thailand
2004 tsunamis
Articles containing video clips
December 2004 events in Asia
History of Southeast Asia
History of the Indian Ocean
Megathrust earthquakes in India
Megathrust earthquakes in Sumatra
Natural disasters in India
Natural disasters in Indonesia
Natural disasters in Somalia
Natural disasters in Sri Lanka
Earthquakes in Thailand
Earthquakes in Myanmar
Tsunamis in India
2000s in Andhra Pradesh
2000s in Kerala
2000s in Tamil Nadu
Tsunamis in Thailand
Tsunamis in Myanmar